Christ's College Chapel is part of Christ's College, Christchurch.

Description

The chapel was designed by Robert Speechly and was built in 1867. Its simple style was in harmony with Christ's College Big School, which is four years older. The chapel was extended in 1884 to a design by Benjamin Mountfort, who added transepts and a chancel; an earlier design by William Armson was rejected. In 1888, a Mountfort-designed organ chamber was added.

The chapel more than doubled in size in 1955 based on a design by Paul Pascoe, who did not interfere with the Gothic Revival appearance of the school's quadrangle.

The chapel was used for the funeral service for Christchurch architect Peter Beaven in June 2012.

The chapel was registered as a heritage building by the New Zealand Historic Places Trust on 27 June 1985 with registration number 3277 classified as A. With the change of the classification system, the building later became a Category I listing.

See also
 List of historic places in Christchurch

References

Heritage New Zealand Category 1 historic places in Canterbury, New Zealand
1867 in New Zealand
Religious buildings and structures in Christchurch
Christchurch Central City
Anglican churches in New Zealand
Benjamin Mountfort church buildings
Christianity in Christchurch
Listed churches in New Zealand
1860s architecture in New Zealand
University and college chapels
Stone churches in New Zealand